Trabrennbahn Bahrenfeld, located in the Bahrenfeld quarter of Hamburg, Germany, is used for harness racing. It was built in 1867 and renovated in 2011.The track has a capacity of 30,000. Maximum capacity for concerts is 90,000.

External links
Venue information
TrabHamburg.de

Horse racing venues in Germany
Sports venues in Hamburg
Buildings and structures in Altona, Hamburg